Lisa Rogak is an American author, primarily of biographies and other non-fiction books. She is also a freelance magazine writer.

Barack Obama: In His Own Words, which Rogak edited, hit the New York Times bestseller list. Her biography of Stephen King, Haunted Heart, was nominated for a 2010 Edgar Award for Best Critical / Biographical Work.

Rogak grew up in Glen Rock, New Jersey and now lives in New Hampshire.

Partial bibliography
 Pretzel Logic: A Novel, Williams Hill Publishing, 1999
 Howard Dean: In His Own Words, St. Martin's Griffin/Thomas Dunne Books, 2003
 Death Warmed Over: Funeral Food, Rituals, and Customs from Around the World, Ten Speed Press, 2004
 Stones and Bones of New England: A Guide to Unusual, Historic, and Otherwise Notable Cemeteries, Globe Pequot, 2004
 The Man Behind the Da Vinci Code: An Unauthorized Biography of Dan Brown, Andrews McMeel Publishing, 2005
 Barack Obama: In His Own Words, PublicAffairs, 2008
 A Boy Named Shel: The Life and Times of Shel Silverstein, St. Martin's Griffin/Thomas Dunne Books, 2009
 Michelle Obama: In Her Own Words, PublicAffairs, 2009
 Haunted Heart: The Life and Times of Stephen King, St. Martin's Griffin/Thomas Dunne Books, 2010
 And Nothing But the Truthiness: The Rise (and further rise) of Stephen Colbert, St. Martin's Griffin/Thomas Dunne Books, 2011
 Dogs of War: The Courage, Love, and Loyalty of Military Working Dogs, St. Martin's Griffin/Thomas Dunne Books, 2011
 Dogs of Courage: The Heroism and Heart of Working Dogs Around the World, St. Martin's Press, 2012
 Dan Brown: The Unauthorized Biography, St. Martin's Press, 2013
 One Big Happy Family: Heartwarming Stories of Animals Caring for One Another, St. Martin's Press, 2013
 Angry Optimist: The Life and Times of Jon Stewart, Thomas Dunne Books, 2014
 Cats on the Job: 50 Fabulous Felines Who Purr, Mouse, and Even Sing for Their Supper, St. Martin's Press, 2015
 The True Tails of Baker and Taylor: The Library Cats Who Left Their Pawprints on a Small Town . . . and the World, St. Martin's Press, 2016
Rachel Maddow: A Biography, St. Martin's Press/Thomas Dunne Books, 2020
Who is Alex Trebek?: A Biography, St. Martin's Press/Thomas Dunne Books, 2020

References

External links
 Lisa Rogak's Website
 Lisa Rogak on the Macmillan Website

American biographers
Edgar Award winners
Living people
Writers from New Jersey
Place of birth missing (living people)
Year of birth missing (living people)
American women biographers
21st-century American women